Ivan Goodingham (8 January 1926 – 24 April 2016) was an Australian rules footballer who played for Essendon in the Victorian Football League (VFL) during the late 1940s. 

From Mordialloc Juniors, Goodingham started out at Essendon in 1946. A left footed follower, he played as a forward pocket in the 1947 Grand Final which they lost to Carlton. He had a solid season that year, kicking 21 goals.

Balance

Holmesby, Russell and Main, Jim (2007). The Encyclopedia of AFL Footballers. 7th ed. Melbourne: Bas Publishing.
Ivan Goodingham's obituary

1926 births
2016 deaths
Australian rules footballers from Victoria (Australia)
Essendon Football Club players